Ahmet Sahin Kaba (born 27 August 1993) is a Turkish judoka.

He is the bronze medallist of the 2017 Judo Grand Prix Antalya in the -60 kg category.

References

External links
 

1993 births
Living people
Turkish male judoka
21st-century Turkish people